The M7 is a  long highway in Nakhchivan. The route runs northwest from the city of Nakhchivan to the border with Turkey in the northwestern end of the exclave. The route is one of three open border crossings in Nakhchivan and the only crossing with Turkey. The entire route is an undivided, four-lane highway, except for a short two-lane section crossing the Umut Bridge into Turkey.

References 

Transportation in Nakhchivan
Roads in Azerbaijan